The Most Hon. Henry Vivien Pierpont Conyngham, 8th Marquess Conyngham (born 25 May 1951), styled as Viscount Slane until 1974 and as Earl of Mount Charles from 1974 until 2009 and predominantly known as Lord Mount Charles, is an Anglo-Irish nobleman who is best known for the rock concerts that he organises at his home Slane Castle, and for his column in the Irish Daily Mirror under the byline "Lord Henry". Despite Lord Conyngham's various titles through the years, titles of nobility are not officially recognised in the Republic of Ireland. The Irish constitution prohibits "titles of nobility or of honour" to be accepted by Irish citizens, except "with the prior approval of the Government". The use of peerages and other similar titles in the Republic of Ireland is a personal affectation, and not for official use.

Biography
Henry Conyngham was born into an aristocratic family of partial Ulster-Scots descent, the eldest son of The 7th Marquess Conyngham (1924–2009) by his first wife, Eileen Wren Newsom. The Conyngham dynasty are members of what used to be known as 'the Ascendancy', the Anglo-Irish aristocracy. He attended Harrow School before studying at Harvard University. Henry became known as the Earl of Mount Charles, a courtesy title, in 1974.

He succeeded his father in the Marquessate of Conyngham and other hereditary peerages in March 2009. However, in the Republic of Ireland, he is frequently referred to as 'Lord Mount Charles', his former courtesy title. He also inherited the title Baron Minster, of Minster Abbey in the County of Kent, created in 1821 in the Peerage of the United Kingdom for his ancestor, The 1st Marquess Conyngham, thereby giving the Marquesses Conyngham the automatic right to sit in the British House of Lords (until 1999).

Conyngham and his wife, Iona Grimston, divide their time between Beauparc House  and Slane Castle in County Meath; the latter was the family's principal ancestral seat until it was badly damaged by fire in 1992, but has now been restored.

Political career

The then Lord Mount Charles unsuccessfully contested the Louth constituency for Fine Gael at the 1992 general election.

In 1997, Conyngham stood for election to Seanad Éireann for the Dublin University constituency, again without success. At the 2004 European Parliament election, he was approached by Fine Gael to enter the contest for selection as a Fine Gael candidate for the East constituency. However, when the television presenter and agricultural journalist Maireád McGuinness emerged as a potential candidate, Conyngham withdrew from the race.

Business career
The Marquess Conyngham enjoys a high profile in Ireland as the author of a weekly column in the Irish Daily Mirror. He has been dubbed the rock and roll aristocrat or the rock and roll peer owing to the very successful series of rock concerts he has hosted since 1981, held in the natural amphitheatre in the grounds of Slane Castle. These concerts have included performances by The Rolling Stones, Thin Lizzy, Queen, U2, Bob Dylan, Bruce Springsteen, David Bowie, Metallica, Guns N' Roses, Oasis and Madonna. Henry, Lord Conyngham, received the Industry Award at the 2010 Meteor Awards. In his autobiography Public Space–Private Life: A Decade at Slane Castle, he described his business career and the challenges of being an Anglo-Irish peer in modern Ireland, and how being Anglo-Irish has gradually become more accepted in the Republic of Ireland.

In 2015, Lord Conyngham opened an Irish whiskey distillery on the demesne of Slane Castle, and launched the "Slane Irish Whiskey" brand.

Personal life
Conyngham married in 1971 Juliet Ann Kitson, daughter of Major Robert Richard Buller Kitson (Grenadier Guards) and English interior decorator and J. Paul Getty's lover Penelope de László (née Steele, later Baroness Keith of Castleacre). They have three children, a daughter and two sons, and were divorced in 1985:

 Alexander Burton Conyngham, Earl of Mount Charles (born 30 January 1975), married Carina Bolton (paternal granddaughter of banker Sir George Bolton and maternal granddaughter of The 4th Baron Terrington), having a daughter and two sons: 
Lady Laragh Conyngham (born 2009)
 Rory Nicholas Burton Conyngham, Viscount Slane (born 2010)
The Hon. Caspar Conyngham (born 2012)
Lady Henrietta Tamara Juliet Conyngham (born 1976), married Thomas, 6th Earl of Lichfield (son of the celebrated photographer Patrick Lichfield)
Lord Wolfe Conyngham (born 1978), celebrity chef.

Conyngham married 1985 Lady Iona Charlotte Grimston (born 1953) in 1985. She is the youngest daughter of The 6th Earl of Verulam. They have a daughter:
Lady Tamara Jane Conyngham (born 1991)

See also 
 Burke's Peerage
 Marquess Conyngham
 Slane Concert

References

Sources
 Public Space-Private Life: A Decade at Slane Castle, September 1989, Faber & Faber

External links
History of Slane Castle by The Eighth Marquess 
Slane Irish Whiskey

1951 births
20th-century Irish people
21st-century Irish landowners
Living people
People from County Meath
Irish music people
People educated at Harrow School
Harvard University alumni
Fine Gael politicians
Irish Anglicans
Henry
Conyngham, Henry Conyngham, 8th Marquess